The 2021 Cazoo World Cup of Darts was the eleventh edition of the PDC World Cup of Darts. It took place from 9–12 September 2021 at the Sparkassen-Arena in Jena, Germany.

Wales (consisting of players Gerwyn Price and Jonny Clayton) were the defending champions, after beating the English team (Michael Smith and Rob Cross) 3–0 in the 2020 final.  However, they lost 2–1 to Scotland (Peter Wright and John Henderson) in the semi-finals.

Scotland went on to win their second title after beating Austria, represented by Mensur Suljović and Rowby-John Rodriguez, in the final 3–1.

Format
The tournament remained at 32 teams this year, with the top 8 teams being seeded and the remaining 24 teams being unseeded in the first round. As with recent years, the tournament is a straight knockout.

First round: Best of nine legs doubles.
Second round, quarter and semi-finals: Two best of seven legs singles matches. If the scores are tied, a best of seven legs doubles match will settle the match.
Final: Three points needed to win the title. Two best of seven legs singles matches are played, followed by a best of seven doubles match. If necessary, one or two best of seven legs singles matches in reverse order are played to determine the champion.

Prize money
Total prize money remained at £350,000.

The prize money per team was:

Teams and seedings
The competing nations were confirmed on 6 September 2021. The Top eight nations based on combined Order of Merit rankings were seeded, and all players named to those teams were the top 2 of each nation on the PDC Order of Merit, with the exception of Scotland and the United States. Peter Wright revealed on September 4 that Gary Anderson would not be representing Scotland for personal reasons and that John Henderson would replace him, while Danny Baggish also had to withdraw from the United States team due to quarantine regulations, with Chuck Puleo replacing him. Players representing unseeded nations were chosen by qualification tournaments specifically for this event.

China and Singapore returned to the competition after having to miss out last year, due to travel problems relating to COVID-19. Croatia were set to return, having not participated in the competition since 2013, but on 7 September, Croatia withdrew following an illness to Boris Krčmar, with Greece (represented by John Michael and Veniamin Symeonidis) replacing them. New Zealand (who were to be represented by Warren Parry and Ben Robb) missed out for the first time owing to their country's COVID travel restrictions, and after a confusion by an incorrect communication sent by PDC Nordic & Baltic, it was revealed that the Latvian team of Madars Razma and Nauris Gleglu would be the first reserves, and not one of the 32 teams in the competition.

Paolo Nebrida was due to represent the Philippines, but had to withdraw as his COVID-19 vaccination was not on the approved list to get him into Germany, so he was replaced by Christian Perez. Russia's Dmitriy Gorbunov also had to withdraw to due quarantine regulations and was replaced by Evgenii Izotov. 

The teams are as follows:

Seeded nations

Unseeded nations

Results

Draw

Second round
Two best of seven legs singles matches. If the scores were tied, a best of seven legs doubles match settled the match.

Quarter-finals
Two best of seven legs singles matches. If the scores were tied, a best of seven legs doubles match settled the match.

Semi-finals
Two best of seven legs singles matches. If the scores were tied, a best of seven legs doubles match will settle the match.

Final
Three match wins were needed to win the title. Two best of seven legs singles matches followed by a best of seven doubles match. If necessary, one or two best of seven legs reverse singles matches were played to determine the champion.

References

 PDC World Cup of Darts
World Cup
PDC
PDC